Chelsea Heights may mean:

Australia
 Chelsea Heights, Victoria, Australia, a suburb of Melbourne

United States
 Chelsea Heights (Druid Hills) near Atlanta, Georgia
 Chelsea Heights & Westchester Hills (Decatur) near Atlanta, Georgia